Eriocottis fuscanella is a moth of the family Eriocottidae. It was described by Philipp Christoph Zeller in 1847. It is found in Italy and on Sardinia, Sicily and Malta.

References

 "Eriocottis fuscanella (Zeller, 1847)". Insecta.pro. Retrieved February 5, 2020.

Moths described in 1847
Eriocottidae
Insects of Turkey
Moths of Europe